Archives of Suicide Research is a quarterly peer-reviewed academic journal covering suicidology. It was established in 1995 and is published by Routledge. It is the official journal of the International Academy of Suicide Research, both of which were founded by Dutch psychologist René Duekstra. The First/Founding editor-in-chief was Dutch-Canadian psychologist, Antoon A. Leenaars. The current editor-in-chief is Barbara Stanley (New York State Psychiatric Institute). According to the Journal Citation Reports, the journal has a 2016 impact factor of 1.901.

References

External links

Suicidology journals
Publications established in 1995
Quarterly journals
Routledge academic journals
English-language journals